Everything I Know About Love is a British comedy-drama television series based on Dolly Alderton's fictionalised memoir of the same name, adapted by Alderton herself and produced by Working Title Television for BBC One and Peacock. The seven-part series premiered on 7 June 2022 in the UK. The series later premiered on NBCUniversal's Peacock streaming service in the US on August 25, 2022, with all seven parts dropping at once together.

Cast
 Emma Appleton as Maggie
 Bel Powley as Birdy 
 Marli Siu as Nell
 Aliyah Odoffin as Amara
 Connor Finch as Street Baxter
 Ryan Bown as Nathan
 Jordan Peters as Neil
 Juliet Cowan as Joan

Production
The adaptation was announced at the May 2021 BBC Drama Preview and as part of Working Title Television's then upcoming slate. Alderton herself would write the series and China Moo-Young would direct. Producers included Tim Bevan, Eric Fellner, Surian Fletcher-Jones, and Jo McClellan.

It was announced in August 2021 that Emma Appleton and Bel Powley would star in the series alongside Marli Siu, Aliyah Odoffin, Jordan Peters, Connor Finch, and Ryan Bown.

Principal photography took place in London and Manchester.

Reception
The review aggregator website Rotten Tomatoes reported a 94% approval rating with an average rating of 7.8/10, based on 18 critic reviews. The website's critics consensus reads, "Frothy and a tad bit frivolous, Everything I Know About Love is less about lessons learned than the joy of the journey -- and it's an absolute blast in the bargain." Metacritic, which uses a weighted average, assigned a score of 73 out of 100 based on 8 critics, indicating "generally favorable reviews".

References

External links
 

2022 British television series debuts
BBC television dramas
Television shows based on British novels
Television series set in 2012
Television shows set in London
Television series by Working Title Television